Ruth Kennedy (married name Ruth Patten; born 1957), is a female former athlete who competed for England.

Athletics career
She represented England and won a gold medal in the women's 4 × 400 metres relay with Jannette Roscoe, Sue Pettett and Verona Bernard, at the 1974 British Commonwealth Games in Christchurch, New Zealand. Four years later she represented England and won a gold medal again in the women's 4 × 100 metres relay, at the 1978 Commonwealth Games in Edmonton, Alberta, Canada. The other team members were Joslyn Hoyte-Smith, Verona Elder and Donna Hartley.

References

1957 births
English female sprinters
Commonwealth Games medallists in athletics
Commonwealth Games gold medallists for England
Athletes (track and field) at the 1974 British Commonwealth Games
Athletes (track and field) at the 1978 Commonwealth Games
Living people
Universiade medalists in athletics (track and field)
Universiade silver medalists for Great Britain
Medallists at the 1974 British Commonwealth Games
Medallists at the 1978 Commonwealth Games